Dead or Alive is a 1921 American silent Western film directed by Dell Henderson and starring Jack Hoxie, Joseph W. Girard and Marin Sais.

Cast
 Jack Hoxie as Jack Stokes
 Joseph W. Girard as Sheriff Lamar
 Marin Sais as Sheriff Lamar's Wife
 C. Ray Florhe as Nate Stratton
 Wilbur McGaugh as Tom Stone
 Evelyn Nelson as Beulah Stone, Tom's Sister

References

External links
 

1921 films
1921 Western (genre) films
Films directed by Dell Henderson
Arrow Film Corporation films
Silent American Western (genre) films
1920s English-language films
1920s American films